Nawathinehena is an extinct Algonquian language formerly spoken among the Arapaho people. It had a phonological development quite different from either Gros Ventre or Arapaho proper. It has been identified as the former language of the Southern Arapaho, who switched to speaking Arapaho proper in the 19th century. However, the language is not well attested, being documented only in a vocabulary collected in 1899 by Alfred L. Kroeber from the Oklahoma Arapaho.

While it shares many important phonological innovations with Arapaho, it presents the merger of *r, *θ and *s with *t as t instead of n as in Arapaho, a sound change reminiscent of Blackfoot and Cheyenne (Goddard 1974, Jacques 2013). PA *w changes to m instead of merging with *r, *s and *n as n.

Notes

References

Jacques, Guillaume 2013. The sound change s>n in Arapaho, Folia Linguistica Historica 34:43-57
Mithun, Marianne  1999.  The Languages of Native North America.  Cambridge Language Surveys.  Cambridge:  Cambridge University Press.

External links
OLAC resources in and about the Nawathinehena language

Arapaho
Plains Algonquian languages
Indigenous languages of the North American Plains
Languages of the United States
Extinct languages of North America